Jacques Dacqmine (1923–2010) was a French stage, film and television actor. He was married four times, including to the actress Odile Versois.

Partial filmography

 Premier rendez-vous (1941) - Un élève du collège (uncredited)
 The Queen's Necklace (1946) - Rétaux de Villette
 Back Streets of Paris (1946) - François
 The White Night (1948) - Jacques Davenne
 Dark Sunday (1948) - Jan Laszlo
 The Secret of Mayerling (1949) - L'Archiduc François-Ferdinand
 Julie de Carneilhan (1950) - Coco Votard
 Darling Caroline (1951) - Gaston de Sallanches
 A Caprice of Darling Caroline (1953) - Gaston de Sallanches
 Caroline and the Rebels (1955) - Général de Sallanches
 Les aristocrates (1955) - Arthus de Maubrun
 It Happened in Aden (1956) - Le major Burton
 Michel Strogoff (1956) - Le Grand-Duc
 Action immédiate (1957) - Walder
 Sylviane de mes nuits (1957) - Lucien
 Charming Boys (1957) - Charles
 La Belle et le Tzigane (1958) - Louis de Vintheuil
 The Road to Shame (1959) - Victor Quaglio
 Web of Passion (1959) - Henri Marcoux
 Classe Tous Risques (1960) - Blot
 Ravishing (1960) - Marc Cotteret
 The Nina B. Affair (1961) - Dr. Zorn
 Quai Notre-Dame (1961) - Lormoy
 The Game of Truth (1961) - Guillaume Geder
 Where the Truth Lies (1962) - Vial
 Il terrore dei mantelli rossi (1963) - Vladimir
 Le commissaire mène l'enquête (1963) - Gilbert (segment "Geste d'un fanatique")
 Francis Coplan (1964) - Le Vieux
 The Exterminators (1965) - Le 'Vieux'
 Phèdre (1968) - Thésée
 Victims of Vice (1978) - Le directeur de la P.J.
 The Missing Link (1980) - Récitant / Narrator (French version, voice)
 La crime (1983) - Me Antoine d'Alins
 La Piovra (1984)
 Inspecteur Lavardin (1986) - Raoul Mons
 Mélo (1986) - Dr. Remy
 Erreur de jeunesse (1989) - M. Monfort
 Nouvelle Vague (1990) - Le PDG
 L'Opération Corned-Beef (1991) - Le général Moulin
 Fortune Express (1991) - Pavlic (uncredited)
 Germinal (1993) - Philippe Hennebeau
 OcchioPinocchio (1994) - Police Chief
 White Lies (1998) - Maître Maillard
 The Dilettante (1999) - M. Delaunay
 The Ninth Gate (1999) - Old Man
 A Crime in Paradise (2001) - Le président Laborde
 Rien que du bonheur (2003) - Jean-Marie Bugues
 Adieu (2003) - Le médecin

References

Bibliography 
 Hayward, Susan. Simone Signoret: The Star as Cultural Sign. Continuum, 2004.

External links 
 

1923 births
2010 deaths
French male stage actors
French male film actors
French male television actors